Wong is the Jyutping, Yale and Hong Kong romanization of the Chinese surnames Huang  and Wang, two ubiquitous Chinese surnames; Wang, another common Chinese surname; and a host of other rare Chinese surnames, including Heng, Hong, Hong, and Hong

Note that, while 汪 (Wang/Wung) could be distinguished by its tone, 黃 (Wong/Huang) and 王 (Wong/Wang) are homophones in Cantonese. To differentiate the two in conversation, 黃 (Wong/Huang) is customarily referred to by native Cantonese speakers as 黃河嘅黃 (Yellow River Wong), 黃金嘅黃 (yellow gold Wong), 大肚黃 (big belly Wong, as the character resembles a person with a big belly), or by native Mandarin speakers as "grass-head Wong" (due to its first radical), whereas 王 (Wong/Wang) is referred as the 三劃王 "three-stroke Wong" (due to its prominent 3 horizontal strokes) or the 'King' Wong (due to its meaning).

Distribution
In Taiwan, names are written using Chinese characters and are currently romanized using the Hanyu Pinyin but previously Wade-Giles was used and many people retain names as such. In Hong Kong and Macau and among the Chinese diaspora abroad, though, many choose to romanize their name according to their regional pronunciation.

Thus, while there is no official tally of "Wongs" inside China or Taiwan, Wong is the 6th most common Chinese name in Singapore, the 3rd most common Chinese name in America, and the most common Chinese name in Ontario, Canada.

Although recent immigration from central and northern China has caused the pinyin romanizations "Wang" and "Huang" to become more common, "Wong" is still by far the most common version in all three locations, just as "Lee" remains more common than "Li".

Origins

The history of the romanization "Wong" begins in	Bianjing (汴京) during the Song dynasty (a noticeable empress Empress Wang (Taizu). Some historical information showed that the name can be traced back to 206 BC–220 AD Han dynasty.

The romanisation "Wong"  is also linked with mainland Chinese  "Wang (surname)" which has a historical name from Zi in Shang dynasty .

The name is widely used in Hong Kong and some of the Commonwealth countries. Many migrants moved to parts of south-east Asia, Europe, Canada, Australia and the United States.

Wong is also a rare English surname derived from Old English "Geong" meaning young. However, Young is the more common surname from this origin.

List of people with the surname

黃/黄
 Alice Wong (Alice Siu-Ping Wong, born 1948), Canadian politician
 Andrew Wong (politician) (born 1943), the last president of the Legislative Council of Hong Kong during British rule
 Anna May Wong (1905–1961), Chinese-American film actress
 Anna Wong (artist) (1930–2013), Canadian artist
 Anthony Wong (Hong Kong actor) (born 1961), Hong Kong actor 
 Barry Wong (1946–1991), Hong Kong screenwriter, film producer and actor
 BD Wong (born 1960), actor in Law & Order: Special Victims Unit
 Ben Wong (born 1965), Hong Kong actor
 Betty Ann Wong (born 1938), American author and composer
 Bob Wong (born 1941), Canadian cabinet minister
 Bosco Wong (born 1980), Hong Kong actor and singer
 Brandon Wong (actor), Malaysian actor
 Carrie Wong (born 1994), Singaporean actress
 David T. Wong (born ), Hong Kong-born American neuroscientist
 Dayo Wong (born 1960), Hong Kong actor, comedian, singer and screenwriter
 Delbert E. Wong (1920–2006), Chinese American judge
 Edward Wong, New York Times reporter
 Eleanor Wong (musician), Hong Kong pianist
 Elizabeth Wong (politician) (born 1972), Malaysian politician
 Elizabeth Wong (author), Hong Kong-born writer and politician
 Emme Wong (born 1981), Hong Kong actress and singer
 Felix Wong (born 1961), Hong Kong actor
 Ferlyn Wong (born 1992), Singaporean singer and former member of South Korean girl group, Skarf
 Freddie Wong (born 1985), American electronic sports player and film maker
 Hsiung-Zee Wong (born 1947), Chinese American composer
 Jade Snow Wong (1922–2006), American ceramic artist and writer
 Jadin Wong, American singer and actress
 Jadyn Wong, Canadian actress
 James Wong (producer) (born 1959), American television producer, writer and film director
 Jan Wong (born 1953), Canadian journalist of Chinese ancestry
 Joe Wong (comedian), Chinese American comedian
 Joshua Wong, Hong Kong student activist and politician
 Joyce Wong (director), Canadian filmmaker
 Kenneth Wong, American political scientist
 Kirk Wong (born 1949), Hong Kong film director and actor
 Kolten Wong, American baseball player with the St. Louis Cardinals
 Magdalen Wong (born 1981), Hong Kong-born American artist
 Mandy Wong (born 1982), Hong Kong actress
 Michael Wong (actor) (born 1965), Chinese-American actor, director, and singer
 Mimi Wong (1939–1973), female convicted murderer executed in Singapore.
 Natalie Wong (born 1976), Hong Kong actress
 Pansy Wong (born 1955), New Zealand politician
 Patrick Wong, Canadian politician
 Paul Wong (musician) (born 1964), Hong Kong singer-songwriter and guitarist
 Peter Wong (Australian politician) (born 1942), Australian politician
 Peter Wong (Canadian politician), former mayor of Sudbury, Ontario, Canada
 Peter Wong (sports commentator), Hong Kong sports commentator
 Philip Wong (1938–2021), Hong Kong politician
 Race Wong (born 1982), Hong Kong actress and singer
 Raymond Wong Ho-yin (born 1975), Hong Kong actor
 Raymond Wong (civil servant) (born 1958), Hong Kong Permanent Secretary for Education
 Raymond Wong (film presenter) (born 1948), Hong Kong actor, film director, producer and scriptwriter
 Raymond Wong (composer), Hong Kong film score composer
 Raymond K. Wong (born 1966), Chinese-American novelist, author of The Pacific Between
 Roberto Wong (born 1979), Costa Rican footballer
 Rosanne Wong (born 1979), Hong Kong actress and singer
 Russel Wong (born 1961), Asian photographer
 Samuel Wong (born 1962), Hong Kong-born Canadian conductor and ophthalmologist
 Sherine Wong (born 1979), Miss Malaysia Universe 1998
 Susan Wong, Hong Kong singer
 Timothy C. Wong (born 1941), Chinese-American sinologist and translator
 Tony Wong (Canadian politician) (1948–2009), parliamentarian from Ontario, Canada
 Tyrus Wong (1910–2016), Chinese-American painter, and muralist
 Victor Wong (actor born 1927) (1927–2001), American actor
 Victor Wong (singer) (born 1972), Malaysian singer
 Willie "Woo Woo" Wong, Chinese-American basketball player
 Wong Ah Kiu (1918–2006), Malaysian woman involved in a freedom of religion case
 Wong Ah Sat (–1916) Chinese Australian of historical interest
 Wong Chen (born 1968), Malaysian politician
 Wong Chi Chung (born 1982), Hong Kong professional footballer
 Wong Chi Tang (born 1979), Hong Kong football referee 
 Wong Chin Hung (born 1982), Hong Kong professional footballer
 Wong Choong Hann (born 1977), professional Malaysian badminton player
 Wong Chun-chun, Hong Kong actress, and film director
 Wong Chun Ting (born 1991), Hong Kong table tennis player
 Wong Chun Yue (born 1978), Hong Kong professional footballer
 Wong Doc-Fai (born 1948), Chinese martial arts expert
 Wong Fei-hung (1847–1924), martial artist, practitioner of traditional Chinese medicine, revolutionary and Chinese folk-hero
 Wong Ho Leng (1959–2014), Malaysian politician
 Wong Jack Man (born ), Chinese martial artist and martial arts teacher
 Wong Jeh Shyan (born 1964), CEO of CommerceNet Singapore
 Wong Jim (1940–2004), Cantopop lyricist and writer
 Wong JingLun (born 1983), Singaporean singer and actor
 Wong Ka Keung (born 1964), Hong Kong musician, composer and songwriter
 Wong Ka Kui (1962–1993), Hong Kong composer, songwriter, musician and singer, founder of the Hong Kong rock band Beyond
 Wong Kam-po (born 1973), Hong Kong racing cyclist
 Wong Kan Seng (born 1946), Singaporean politician
 Wong Kei-ying (1815–1886), Chinese martial artist and physician
 Wong Kew-Lit (born 1971), Malaysian film director and producer
 Wong Kwok-kin (born 1952), Hong Kong politician
 Wong Kwok-pun (born 1946), Hong Kong poet and translator
 Wong Li-Lin (born 1972), Singaporean actress
 Wong Mew Choo (born 1983), Malaysian badminton player
 Wong Peng Soon (1918–1996), Singaporean badminton player
 Wong Shik Ling (1908–1959), Hong Kong Cantonese linguist
 Wong Shun Leung (1935–1997), Hong Kong martial arts expert
 Wong Sing Chi (born 1957), Hong Kong politician
 Wong Ting-kwong (born 1949), Hong Kong politician
 Wong Yan Lung (born 1963), Hong Kong barrister and judge
 Wong Yiu Fu (born 1981), Hong Kong footballer
 Wong Yuk-long (born 1950), Hong Kong Manhua artist
 Wong Yuk-man (born 1951), Hong Kong politician and author
 Lucas Wong (born 1999), Hong Kong singer, rapper, dancer, and model, member of South Korean boy group NCT, it's Chinese sub-unit WayV and rotational sub-unit NCT U
 Wong Yung-kan (born 1951), Hong Kong politician

王
 Alfonso Wong (王家禧 born 1923), Hong Kong manhua artist
 Amy Wong (producer), Hong Kong film producer
 Angel Wong Chui Ling, a Hong Kong-born expat in Malaysia-based TV and radio personality, host and columnist.
 Bryan Wong (born 1971), Singaporean TV actor and television host
 Dave Wong (Wong Kit, born 1962), Mandopop and Cantopop pop star
 David Shou-Yeh Wong, Hong Kong billionaire, finance tycoon and philanthropist
 Emily Wong (born 1990), Hong Kong actress and singer
 Faye Wong (born 1969), Hong Kong singer, songwriter, actress and model
 Francis Wong, American jazz saxophonist, and flutist
 Grace Wong, Hong Kong actress
 Gregory Wong (born 1978), Hong Kong actor
 H. S. Wong (1900–1981), Chinese newsreel photojournalist
 Hazel Wong, a UAE-Hong Kong architect
 Ivana Wong (Wong Oi Chi, born 1979), Hong Kong singer
 Jacky Wong (Jacky Wong Shu Hei, born 1998), Hong Kong child actor
 Joey Wong (born 1967), Taiwanese actress
 Joseph Wong (Joseph Wong Wing Ping, born 1948), Hong Kong government official
 Kolten Wong (Kolten Kaha Wong, born 1990), American Major League Baseball player, currently second baseman for the St. Louis Cardinals
 Kristina Wong (Kristina Sheryl Wong), American artist, writer and actor
 Manfred Wong (Manfred Wong Man-Chun, born 1957), Hong Kong film producer, screenwriter, director and actor
 Michael Wong (actor) (born 1965), a Chinese-American actor based in Hong Kong
 Michael Wong (singer) (born 1970), Malaysian singer
 Peter Wong (Peter Wong Tung-shun, born 1951), Hong Kong General Manager of HSBC Group
 Ricky Wong (Hong Kong businessman) (Ricky Wong Wai Kay, born 1962), Hong Kong entrepreneur
 Rosanna Wong (Rosanna Wong Yick-ming, born 1952), Hong Kong social work administrator and politician
 Alexandra Wong (born 1956), Hong Kong social activist
 Roy Bin Wong, Chinese-American economics historian
 Russell Wong (born 1963), American actor and photographer
 Teresa Wong, Hong Kong Chinese Erhu player
 Vincent Wong (born 1983), Hong Kong actor and singer
 Winston Wong (born 1951), Taiwanese businessman and chair of the Formosa Plastics Group (FPG)
 Wong Chin Foo, Chinese-American journalist
 Wong Choon Wah (1947–2014), Malaysian footballer
 Wong Cho-lam (born 1980), Hong Kong singer and actor
 Wong Chun Ho (born 1990), Hong Kong professional footballer
 Wang Feifei (Fei, born 1987), Chinese singer with South Korean girl group Miss A
 Wong Foon Meng, Malaysian engineer and politician
 Wong He (born 1967), Hong Kong actor
 Wong Jing, Hong Kong film director, producer, actor, presenter, and screenwriter
 Wong Kar-wai (born 1958), Hong Kong film director
 Wong Kwok-hing (born 1949), Hong Kong trade unionist
 Wong Tin-lam (born 1928), Hong Kong screenwriter, director, and actor

汪

 Wayne Wong (born 1981), tennis player from Hong Kong
 Wayne Wong (skier) (born 1950), Canadian freestyle skier, Canadian Ski Hall of Fame and U.S. Ski and Snowboard Hall of Fame
Wong Yue (1955-2008), Hong Kong martial arts actor and Shaw Brothers alumnus, also known as Wang Yu in Mandarin for being a lookalike for another ex-Shaw actor Jimmy Wang Yu

翁

Pinyin: wēng, wěng (weng1, weng3); Jyutping: jung1; Min Nan POJ: ang

 Chi-Huey Wong (born 1948), Taiwanese-born American biochemist
 Wong Chin-chu (born 1947), Taiwanese politician

Other
 Adam Wong (born 1985), Canadian artistic gymnast
 Alan Wong, co-founder of Hawaii Regional Cuisine
 Ali Wong (born 1982), American actress, stand-up comic and writer
Aline Wong (born 1941), Singaporean politician and sociologist
 Alison Wong (born 1960), New Zealand poet
 Amy Wong, fictional Futurama character
 Andrea Wong, American Chief Executive Officer and President of Lifetime Networks
 Andy Asook Wong, New Zealand actor
 Ansel Wong (born 1945), Trinidadian cultural and political activist
 Anthony Wong (Anthony Brandon Wong, born 1965), Australian actor
 Baim Wong (born 1981), Indonesian actor
 Bang Wong, creative director of the Broad Institute at MIT and Harvard University
 Benedict Wong (born 1970), English actor and comedian
 Barbara Jean Wong (1924–1999), American actress
 Bennet Wong (Bennet Randall Wong, born 1930), Canadian psychiatrist, author and lecturer
 Brian Wong (born 1991), Canadian Internet entrepreneur
 Byron Wong, Canadian music producer and musician
 Casanova Wong (born 1945), Korean martial arts expert and actor
 Charlene Wong (born 1966), Canadian figure skater
 Christopher Wong, film score composer
 Chris Wong Won or Fresh Kid Ice, Trinidadian rapper and singer
 Claire Wong, Singaporean actress and writer
 Connie Wong (born 1977), Hong Kong cricketer
 Connor Wong (born 1996), American professional baseball player
 Cyril Wong (born 1977), Singaporean poet and writer
 David Wong, American author, pen name of Jason Pargin
 David Wong, American professor of philosophy
 Dick Yin Wong (1920–1978), American lawyer and judge
 Donald Wong (born 1952), American businessman and state legislator
 Eleanor Wong, Singaporean writer and playwright
 Ellen Wong Cambodian Canadian actress 
 Erasmo Wong, Peruvian-Chinese businessman, founder of the Wong supermarket chain
 Ernest Wong, Australian politician
 Esther Wong (1917–2005), Chinese American music promoter
 Fang Wong (born 1948), United States Army officer
 Gwen Wong (Gwen Lipscomb), Filipino-American model and actress
 Harry Wong, American educator and author
 Howard Wong, American dancer
 Isaiah Wong (born 2001), American basketball player
 Issy Wong (born 2002), English cricketer
 Jadin Wong (1913–2010), American dancer, actress, comedian
 James Wong Chye Fook (born 1952), Malaysian footballer
 James Wong, British ethnobotanist and television presenter
 Jo Y. Wong, Canadian professor of mechanical engineering
 Joe Wong (born 1976),  American football offensive lineman
 Joseph Yu Kai Wong, Canadian medical doctor, founder of The Yee Hong Centre for Geriatric Care
 Julia Wong, film editor
 Justin Wong, American professional fighting game player
 Kailee Wong (born 1976), American football linebacker
 Kevin Wong (Kevin Kahn Wong, born 1972), American professional beach volleyball player
 Lee Anne Wong, American chef
 Leonard Wong, U.S. Army research professor, and author on leadership strategy
 Linda Wong (1951–1987), American adult film actress
 Lyen Wong (Milagros Lyen Wong Aseguinolaza, born 1974), German-Cuban fitness athlete
 Martha Wong, American politician
 Martin Wong (1946–1999), American painter
 Mary W. S. Wong, American professor of law
 Mike Wong (born 1925), American ice hockey forward
 Nellie Wong (born 1934), American poet and feminist
 Nicole Wong, American deputy general counsel at Google
 Norman Wong, American writer
 Patty Wong, Peruvian-Chinese model and entertainer
 Paul Wong (born 1954), Canadian multimedia artist
 Penny Wong (born 1968), Australian senator
 Peter Wong (1932–1998), Canadian politician
 Pio Wong, Fijian politician
 Ricardo Wong, Peruvian politician
 Ricky Wong (born 1981), Malaysian entrepreneur and philanthropist
 Rita Wong (born 1968), Canadian poet
 Shawn Wong (born 1949), American professor of English
 Stanford Wong (born 1943), pen name of John Ferguson, gambling author
 Ted Wong (1937–2010), American martial arts practitioner
 Ted Wong, US Army General
 Terry Wong, Canadian pilot and astronaut
 Tien Wong (born 1968), Australian medical researcher
 Tobi Wong (1974–2010), Canadian artist and designer
 Victor Wong (1906–1972), American actor
 Y. C. Wong (1921–2000), Chinese-American architect
 Wong Chan Tong, Macau civil servant
 Wong Chin Huat, Malaysian political scientist
 Wong Fei-lung (born 1943), Hong Kong actor and action director
 Wong How Man (born 1949), Chinese explorer
 Wong Kam Kau (born 1978), Hong Kong fencer
 Wong Kiew Kit (born 1944), Chinese martial arts expert and writer
 Wong Meng Kong (born 1963), Singaporean chess grandmaster
 Wong Pei Tty (born 1981), Malaysian badminton player
 Wong Sai Hou, Malaysian politician
 Wong Sai Kong (born 1978), Malaysian footballer
 Wong Tsu (1893–1965), Chinese-American aircraft designer and aviator

Others
 Alex Wong (disambiguation)
 Amy Wong (disambiguation)
 Andrew Wong (disambiguation)
 Anthony Wong (disambiguation)
 Brandon Wong (disambiguation)
 Chris Wong (disambiguation)
 David Wong (disambiguation)
 Doctor Wong (disambiguation)
 Eleanor Wong (disambiguation)
 Elizabeth Wong (disambiguation)
 Faye Wong (disambiguation)
 Helena Wong (disambiguation)
 James Wong (disambiguation)
 Jing Wong (disambiguation)
 Joe Wong (disambiguation)
 Joshua Wong (disambiguation)
 Julia Wong (disambiguation)
 Wong Ka Wai (disambiguation)
 Linda Wong (disambiguation)
 Michael Wong (disambiguation)
 Paul Wong (disambiguation)
 Peter Wong (disambiguation)
 Raymond Wong (disambiguation)
 Ricky Wong (disambiguation)
 S. L. Wong (disambiguation)
 Stephen Wong (disambiguation)
 Suzie Wong (disambiguation)
 Tony Wong (disambiguation)
 Victor Wong (disambiguation)
 Vincent Wong (disambiguation)
Cory Wong

See also

 Variant romanizations (accompanied by further information): 
 Huang (surname) 
 Wang (surname) 
 Ah Wong, surname

Chinese-language surnames
Multiple Chinese surnames
Surnames of Malaysian origin